Alojz Knafelc (23 June 1859 – 26 April 1937) was a Slovene cartographer, mountaineer and the inventor of the Slovene trail blaze.

Life and work
Knafelc was born in Šmihel pri Novem Mestu. At first he worked as a drawer for the project of constructing the railway connection between Hrpelje and Kozina. Here he had to take care of different signatures and measurement tables. Several times he recoloured the Aljaž Tower on Triglav. He also wrote the instructions on path-blazing, published in 1922 in the Alpine Gazette. He died in Ljubljana.

Knafelc blaze
The Knafelc blaze, introduced in 1922, is a white dot inside a red ring. A variant with a yellow dot in the center is used for the European long-distance paths E6 and E7. A variant with a green ring around a red ring and a white dot in the center is used on the borders of the country. The Knafelc blaze was later used all over Yugoslavia and is prescribed for Slovenia by the 2007 Mountain Paths Act.

References
 Knafelc's biography. Bojan Bračič. 2009. Published by the Post of Slovenia.

External links

1859 births
1937 deaths
Slovenian inventors
Slovenian cartographers
Slovenian mountain climbers
People from the City Municipality of Novo Mesto